Raedene Estate is a suburb of Johannesburg, South Africa. It is found just north of Sydenham. It is located in Region E of the City of Johannesburg Metropolitan Municipality.

History
The suburb is situated on part of an old Witwatersrand farm called Klipfontein. Named after the land owner Rae Sandler and dene meaning a valley, it became a suburb on 13 February 1935.

References

Johannesburg Region E